Kënzeg may refer to:

Clemency, Luxembourg, in Luxembourgish Kënzeg or in German Küntzig, a town and a former commune in south-western Luxembourg
Kuntzig, in German Künzig or Kënzeg, a commune in the Moselle department in Grand Est in north-eastern France